The Tikhiy Don is a Vladimir Ilyich-class (project 301, BiFa125M) Soviet/Russian river cruise ship, cruising in the Volga – Neva basin. The ship was built by VEB Elbewerften Boizenburg/Roßlau at their shipyard in Boizenburg, East Germany, and entered service in 1977. 2004–2015 owned and operated by Grand Circle Cruise Line.  Her home port is currently Rostov-on-Don.

Features
The ship has restaurant, bar, conference hall and library.

See also
 List of river cruise ships

References

External links

1977 ships
River cruise ships
Ships built in East Germany
Passenger ships of the Soviet Union
Ships of Russia
Passenger ships of Russia